is a passenger railway station in located in the city of  Hirakata, Osaka Prefecture, Japan, operated by the private railway company Keihan Electric Railway.

Lines
Hirakata-kōen Station is served by the  Keihan Main Line, and is located 20.8 km from the starting point of the line at Yodoyabashi Station.

Station layout
The station has two ground-level opposed side platforms connected by an underground passage.

Platforms

Adjacent stations

History
It was renamed to its present name on 1 October 1949.

Future plans 
The facilities are expected to be moved to a new elevated station by 2028. Construction has been in progress since September 2022.

Passenger statistics
In fiscal 2019, the station was used by an average of 20,741 passengers daily.

Surrounding area
Hirakata Park 
Japan National Route 170 (Hirakata Ohashi)
Hirakata Municipal Hirakata Elementary School

See also 
List of railway stations in Japan

References

External links

Official home page 

Railway stations in Osaka Prefecture
Railway stations in Japan opened in 1910
Hirakata, Osaka